The supraduodenal artery is an artery which usually branches from Gastroduodenal artery. This artery supplies the superior portion of the duodenum.

References

External links
 

Arteries of the abdomen